Cambria: A Welsh Geographical Review was a journal published in Wales between 1974 and 1989. Though edited by members of the Geography Departments of Swansea University and Aberystwyth University, the publication was run as an independent business, and production values were basic. Cambria was an annual English-language academic journal containing articles and book reviews on geographical and related topics. It has been digitized by the Welsh Journals Online project at the National Library of Wales.

References

External links 
 Cambria at Welsh Journals Online

Magazines published in Wales
European studies journals
Geography journals
Publications established in 1974
Publications disestablished in 1989
English-language journals
Defunct journals of the United Kingdom
Annual journals
Book review magazines
Works about Wales